Nossebro is a locality and the seat of Essunga Municipality in Västra Götaland County, Sweden. It had 1,846 inhabitants in 2010.

References 

Municipal seats of Västra Götaland County
Swedish municipal seats
Populated places in Västra Götaland County
Populated places in Essunga Municipality